Amzie Ellen Strickland (January 10, 1919 – July 5, 2006) was an American character actress who began in radio, made some 650 television appearances, had roles in two dozen films, appeared in numerous television movies, and also worked in TV commercials.

Radio
Strickland began as a radio actress during the old-time radio era, and her various radio roles included those shown in the table below.

Television
Strickland appeared (sometimes on a recurring basis) on such programs as Adam-12, Dragnet, with Jack Webb, Gunsmoke, The Dick Van Dyke Show, The Andy Griffith Show, I Love Lucy, Make Room for Daddy, The Twilight Zone, My Three Sons,  Leave It To Beaver, Gunsmoke, Gomer Pyle USMC, 
Mission: Impossible, Alias Smith & Jones, Happy Days, Carter Country, Bonanza, The Golden Girls, The Facts of Life, The Jeffersons, Three's Company,  ER, Dr. Quinn, Medicine Woman, 7th Heaven, Ellen, Wings, ALF, Dragnet, Father Dowling Mysteries, Full House, Ned and Stacey, Perry Mason, and Knight Rider. Her TV movies include Tower of Terror and Inherit the Wind.

Films

Her film credits include roles in Captain Newman, M.D., Penelope, Kotch, Harper Valley PTA, Pretty Woman, Doc Hollywood, Shiloh, and Krippendorf's Tribe.

Personal life and death
Strickland was born in Oklahoma City, Oklahoma. 

She was married to radio and television actor Frank Behrens from 1946 until his death in 1986. They had a son, Tim Behrens. 

She died of Alzheimer's disease at the age of 87 in 2006.

Strickland adhered to Roman Catholicism and was a lifelong Republican.

References

External links
 
 Profile, TV.com

1919 births
2006 deaths
American film actresses
American radio actresses
American television actresses
Deaths from Alzheimer's disease
Actresses from Oklahoma City
Deaths from dementia in Washington (state)
20th-century American actresses
21st-century American actresses
Washington (state) Republicans
Oklahoma Republicans
California Republicans
American Roman Catholics